Tang Liyao (born 23 January 1974), also known as Lisa Tang, is a Chinese former professional tennis player.

Tang, who played in the juniors at Wimbledon, qualified for the main draw of the 1994 Nokia Open in Beijing and won her first round match, over Chinese wildcard Yi Jing-Qian. She had a career high singles ranking of 410 in the world.

ITF finals

Singles: 1 (1–0)

Doubles: 3 (3–0)

References

External links
 
 

1974 births
Living people
Chinese female tennis players